The Manikato Stakes is a Moonee Valley Racing Club Group 1 Thoroughbred horse race for horses aged three years old and over under Weight for age conditions, over a distance of 1200 metres. It is held at Moonee Valley Racecourse in Melbourne, Australia in late October. Total prize money for the race is A$2,000,000

History
The race is named after the great race horse Manikato, who won this race twice as well as winning 5 consecutive William Reid Stakes at Moonee Valley from 1979 to 1983.

In 2009 the event was part of the Breeders' Cup Challenge series with the winner of the Manikato Stakes automatically qualifying for a berth in the Breeders' Cup Turf Sprint in the United States.

From 2012, the race date was moved to Cox Plate Carnival Friday night in late October.

While the race is a sprinter's race there are 4 winners who have won the prestigious W. S. Cox Plate: 
 Strawberry Road (1983), Rubiton (1987), Dane Ripper (1997) and Sunline (2000).

Distance
 1968–1971 - 6 furlongs (~1200 metres)
 1972 onwards - 1200 metres

Grade
 1968–1978 -  Principal race
 1979–1988 - Group 2 race
 1989 onwards -  Group 1 race

Name
 1968–1983 - Freeway Stakes
 1984 onwards - Manikato Stakes

Record
Time: Track record for the 1200 metres at Moonee Valley is 1:08.76 set by Hey Doc in this race in 2020.

Winners

 2022 - Bella Nipotina
 2021 - Jonker
2020 - Hey Doc
2019 - Loving Gaby
2018 - Brave Smash
2017 - Hey Doc
2016 - Rebel Dane
2015 - Chautauqua
2014 - Lankan Rupee
2013 - Buffering
2012 - Sea Siren
2011 - Sepoy
2010 - Hay List
2009 - Danleigh
2008 - Typhoon Zed
2007 - Gold Edition
2006 - Miss Andretti
2005 - Spark Of Life
2004 - Spark Of Life
2003 - Spinning Hill
2002 - Spinning Hill
2001 - Piavonic
2000 - Sunline
1999 - Redoute's Choice
1998 - Dane Ripper
1997 - Spartacus
1996 - Poetic King
1995 - You Remember
1994 - Spanish Mix
1993 - Never Undercharge
1992 - King Marauding
1991 - Sonic Express
1990 - Street Ruffian
1989 - Our Westminster
1988 - Rancho Ruler
1987 - Rubiton
1986 - Lockley's Tradition
1985 - Touch Of Genius
1984 - Vite Cheval
1983 - Strawberry Road
1982 - Manikato
1981 - Silver Bounty
1980 - Grey Sapphire
1979 - Manikato
1978 - Vice Regal
1977 - Ease The Squeeze
1976 - Scamanda
1975 - Lord Dudley
1974 - Tauto
1973 - Tauto
1972 - Century
1971 - Dual Choice
1970 - Dual Choice
1969 - Vain
1968 - Winfreux

See also
 List of Australian Group races
Group races

References

Group 1 stakes races in Australia
Open sprint category horse races
Recurring sporting events established in 1968